The 1930 VPI Gobblers football team represented Virginia Polytechnic Institute in the 1930 college football season.  The team was led by their head coach Orville Neale and finished with a record of five wins, three losses and one tie (5–3–1).

Schedule

Players
The following players were members of the 1930 football team according to the roster published in the 1931 edition of The Bugle, the Virginia Tech yearbook.

Game summaries

Roanoke
The starting lineup for VPI was: Seaman (left end), Ritter (left tackle), Jones (left guard), Brown (center), Hite (right guard), Green (right tackle), McIntre (right end), Hooper (quarterback), Spear (left halfback), Ottley (right halfback), Owens (fullback). The substitutes were: Cubberly, Hall, Hardwick, Howard, Miles, Palmer, Stark and Swart.

North Carolina
The starting lineup for VPI was: Seaman (left end), Swart (left tackle), Dyke (left guard), Brown (center), Stark (right guard), Green (right tackle), McIntre (right end), Hooper (quarterback), Spear (left halfback), Hardwick (right halfback), Owens (fullback). The substitutes were: Chandler, Grinus, Hall, Hite, Howard, Jones, Kasun, Ottley, Palmer, Ritter and Wimmer.

Vanderbilt
The starting lineup for VPI was: McIntre (left end), Grinus (left tackle), Dyke (left guard), Brown (center), Stark (right guard), Swart (right tackle), Seaman (right end), Hooper (quarterback), Hall (left halfback), Ottley (right halfback), Owens (fullback).

William & Mary
The starting lineup for VPI was: Seaman (left end), Ritter (left tackle), Dyke (left guard), Brown (center), Stark (right guard), Green (right tackle), McIntre (right end), Hooper (quarterback), Hall (left halfback), Ottley (right halfback), Howard (fullback). The substitutes were: Hardwick, Hite, Jones, Owens and Swart.

Davidson
The starting lineup for VPI was: Seaman (left end), Ritter (left tackle), Stark (left guard), Brown (center), Hite (right guard), Green (right tackle), McIntre (right end), Hooper (quarterback), Spear (left halfback), Ottley (right halfback), Howard (fullback). The substitute was Grinus.

Washington and Lee
The starting lineup for VPI was: Seaman (left end), Stark (left tackle), Hite (left guard), Brown (center), Dyke (right guard), Grinus (right tackle), McIntre (right end), Hooper (quarterback), Spear (left halfback), Hall (right halfback), Howard (fullback).

Virginia
The starting lineup for VPI was: Seaman (left end), Stark (left tackle), Jones (left guard), Brown (center), Hite (right guard), Ritter (right tackle), McIntre (right end), Hooper (quarterback), Owens (left halfback), Spear (right halfback), Howard (fullback). The substitutes were: Chandler, Dyke, Green, Kasun, Swart and Wimmer.

Maryland
The starting lineup for VPI was: Seaman (left end), Stark (left tackle), Hite (left guard), Brown (center), Jones (right guard), Green (right tackle), McIntre (right end), Hooper (quarterback), Owens (left halfback), Hall (right halfback), Howard (fullback).

VMI
The starting lineup for VPI was: Seaman (left end), Stark (left tackle), Hite (left guard), Brown (center), Jones (right guard), Grinus (right tackle), McIntre (right end), Hardwick (quarterback), Hooper (left halfback), Owens (right halfback), Howard (fullback).

References

VPI
Virginia Tech Hokies football seasons
VPI Gobblers football